This is a list of bridges currently on the National Register of Historic Places in the U.S. state of Texas.

References

 
Texas
Bridges
Bridges